Cedar Falls is an unincorporated community in King County, Washington. It began as a construction camp for the Seattle Municipal Light and Power Plant. It was a joint-company town of Seattle City Light, Seattle Water Department, and Chicago, Milwaukee, St. Paul and Pacific Railroad, with each company providing separate housing and amenities for its employees and their families.

References

External links
 

Unincorporated communities in King County, Washington
Unincorporated communities in Washington (state)